Verbița is a commune in Dolj County, Oltenia, Romania with a population of 1,570. It is composed of two villages, Verbicioara and Verbița.

References

Communes in Dolj County
Localities in Oltenia